Bislig, officially the City of Bislig, is a 3rd class component city in the province of Surigao del Sur, Philippines. According to the 2020 census, it has a population of 99,290 people.

It is the most populous among the cities and municipalities in the province of Surigao del Sur.

Barangay Mangagoy, the downtown area often dubbed by its residents as "the little city within the city", is the center of trade and industry of Bislig which has a population of 32,464 as of the 2015 estimate. It is the largest barangay in the city and the entire province of Surigao del Sur in terms of population. Since Barangay Poblacion is often referred by the locals simply as 'Bislig', Mangagoy on the other hand is often mistaken as a separate town though it is only just one out of the 24 barangays that comprises the entire City of Bislig.

In 2000, Bislig was converted into a city per Republic Act 8804. It is the easternmost city in the Philippines.

Etymology

The legendary allusions as to how Bislig got its name could be traced back to the era prior to the coming of the Spanish conquistadors. The town got its name from a forest vine of the rattan family that grew in abundance along the banks of its rivers. This vine was noted for its strength and became known for saving a royal couple who crossed the swollen river in one of their hunting expeditions and who almost died as they were carried downstream by the rushing current. The legend has it that these hunters had already lost hope of surviving until they were able to cling to a vine which was about 1/4 inch in diameter called Bislig. As a sign of thanksgiving, the ruler named this place Bislig.

Historically, Bislig derived its name from the word "bizlin", a kind of gold, "which is worth two pesos a tael. The weight of a tael is one and one-eight ounces" in the 16th century, which the natives used for trade and barter. Prior to the coming of Spaniards, this terminology was understood in Luzon and in Mindanao. In the report of the Administrator of Royal Properties Andres Mirandaola dated September 8, 1573, sent to King Philip of Spain that "much gold found in the island of Mindanao, District of Butuan, Surigao ..." It is believed that this kind of gold found in the rolling hills and mountains of the southernmost portion of Bislig and Agusan Province.

However, historical records shows that the name has been variously spelled by the Spanish chroniclers. Conquistador Miguel de Loarca, in his extreme exploratory survey trip of the archipelago, first mentioned and spelled it "Beslin" in his historical accounts "Relacion de los Yslas Filipinas" in 1582, as well as in the Confirmaciones de Encomienda (1616–1700) which Bislig was under the encomienda of Alferez Juan delas Marianas in 1619. In the "Historia general de los religiosos descalzos del orden de San Agustin" of Fray Andres de San Nicolas in 1664 spelled it "Bislin" and also in the "Historia general... del Orden de San Agustin" of Fray Luis de Jesus in 1681. A Franciscan writer, Fray Juan de San Francisco de San Antonio spelled it "Baslig" in his "Cronicas" in 1738. Other Spanish chroniclers spelled it "Bislic" and "Bisliq".

In the first detailed map of the Philippines in 1749, published in "Historia de la Provincia de Filipinas" by a Jesuit, Father Pedro Murillo Velarde spelled it Bislig, as did in the "Historia General ..." of Fray Pedro San Francisco de Assis in 1768 and in the "Mapa dela Provincia de Caraga" by Francisco Alegre in 1751. A complete statistical data of District of Caraga compiled in 1750 spelled as "Bislig", and also in the document titled "Provincia de San Nicolas de Tolentino de Agustinos descalzos dela Congregacion de España y Indias" in 1879.

From the time on, it is known and spelled as Bislig.

Geography

Bislig has a land area of 40,503 hectares spread over 24 barangays, with close to half which are tropical rainforests is classified as "public forest".

Climate

Bislig has a tropical rainforest climate (Af) with heavy to very heavy rainfall year-round and with extremely heavy rainfall in January.

Barangays

Bislig City is politically subdivided into 24 barangays.

History

The first inhabitants of Bislig were believed to have come from the Agusan Valley in the hinterlands of Mindanao beyond the Magdiwata Mountains. These people used spears, bows and arrows and lived a semi-nomadic life and were called Manobos.

They were ruled during the later part of the seventeenth century by a native leader called "Bagani", meaning a formidable leader. They were very brave, tough and war-like. They also introduced edible crops such as rice, corn and rootcrops to the area.

At the turn of the century, Spanish colonizers and missionaries imposed the rule of Spain and brought with them Tagalogs, Ilonggos, and Cebuanos from the north as members of their expeditionary forces.

Long before it became a town on January 1, 1921, per Executive Order No. 62 issued by Governor General Francis Burton Harrison on December 28, 1920 (with Primitivo A. Castillo as its first Municipal President, Vice-president: Sulpicio P. Laurente & Councilors: Ciriaco Alba; Bartolome Alvar; Higino Basañez; Escolastico Carmen; Tomas Masancay; Basilio Dua; and Macario Tenchavez), Bislig was already an established political instrumentality or "pueblo" in the Province of Surigao (now Surigao del Sur and Surigao del Norte). Earlier, the province was a part of an even bigger territory stretching from northeastern Mindanao down to the island's southeastern "pueblo" of Caraga and Man-ay in Davao Oriental. Caraga was originally the seat of political, military and religious authority.

Following its becoming a town, efforts were made to improve and develop Bislig until the advent of its citihood campaign in 1999; and by virtue of Republic Act No. 8804, Bislig was converted into a component city. This was duly ratified and approved in a plebiscite conducted on September 18, 2000.

Demographics

A local language, called Kamayo is sometimes used by the residents, though they usually use the more general Cebuano language of the region.

Economy

Barangay Mangagoy is the center of trade and industry of the city which has a population of roughly 50,000 and is the largest barangay in population in the entire province of Surigao del Sur. Espiritu Street and the adjacent areas within is colloquially often referred simply to as 'Barrio' by the locals in which the business district in Mangagoy is located. It houses national and local banks. Telecommunication such as Internet, cellular phones, cable televisions and leased data lines are well-available in the vicinity of Mangagoy. There used to be movie houses as well. There are also accommodating inns and hotels, as well as motorized tricycles, jeepneys, and buses ply its concrete roads and highways.

Bislig was the home of the defunct company PICOP Resources, Inc. (PRI, or previously known as the Paper Industries Corporation of the Philippines), which was the largest paper mill in Asia and one of the largest in the world. It is geographically situated at Barangay Tabon and its concession is a sanctuary of the Philippine eagle. The permanent shutdown was officially ruled on mid-2008.

In a televised press conference aired by the Presidential Communications in September 2020, construction firm JM McGregor Haggens, Inc. announced that they will be embarking in a multi-billion peso port complex in Bislig to be called "The Maritime City", the first of its kind in the country. The hub will consist of at least 15 projects, including an oil refinery, oil depot, shipyard, container port, cold storage, food processing plant, power plant, water treatment facility, hospital, hotel, integrated market, convention center, and a government center. The first phase of construction is scheduled in early 2021. The said project will be funded by Aria Indonesia-Aria Asset Management of Luxembourg and nine other entities from different countries.

Tourism

Known for its ecotourism, Bislig's main tourist attraction is the Tinuy-an Falls, known as the little "Niagara Falls" of the Philippines. It is a white water curtain that flows in three levels about 55 meters high and 95 meters wide. Its critically acclaimed majestic and unique natural formation was once appeared in the International Travel Magazine. It is also said to be the widest waterfalls in the Philippines.

Other known tourist attractions include: the white-sand beaches of Hagonoy Island; the various white sand beaches in Barangay Lawigan facing and considered a part of the Pacific Ocean; the underground river of the educational Delot and Hinayagan Cave; the Togonan Falls in Barangay Sibaroy which is a 30-minute ride a far from the city proper; the wild sanctuary of the Forester's Park; the wide range waters of the Mone River and the man-made Lake 77 which offers a boat ride tour and a floating cottage ideal for picnic and fishing; the Kamayo Heritage Park; the Cawa-Cawa Sa Awog; the Sian Falls; the Bislig Hot Spring; the Florland Inland Resort in Barangay San Vicente; the Maria Regina Highland Farm and Resort in Dao-Dao, Barangay San Fernando; the Chocolate Beach ideal for the avid mud skim boarding enthusiasts; the newly developed Mabakat beach (the former Dampingan area) ideal for surfing aficionados; the International Doll House at the Ocean View Park in Barangay Comawas; and the City Baywalk Park. Trekking and bird watching could also be available in Bislig's densely natural forested areas.

Bislig hosts an annual festival called "The Karawasan Festival" during the charter day of the city which features an inter-school ethnic dance competition. Karawasan came from a local dialect which means "movement of the crabs". Karawasan is held every 17th day of September. It was replaced by the "Tinuy-an (Sayaw) Festival" since September 2013 and reinstated in 2019.

Festivals and events
 Tinuy-an Sayaw Festival : Bislig City's major festival celebrated every September 17. It is the city's co-major event along with the Karawasan Festival.
 Charter Day Celebration : Celebrated from September 16 to 18, the city celebrate its cityhood.
 Mangagoy Fiesta : Celebrated every July 19, the feast day of St. Vincent de Paul.
 Sinulog Festival : Celebrated every third Sunday of January during the feast of Santo Niño.
 Kawadang Festival : Celebrated every September 21, four days after the Karawasan Festival.
 Poblacion Fiesta : Celebrated every September 22, the feast day of Santo Tomas de Villanueva.
 Uli Bislig : Celebrated every September 16, it literally means "going back home to Bislig".
 Karawasan Festival : As part of the Charter Day Celebration, a dream come true for the City Government of Bislig. Karawasan is a festival of ethnic dances depicting the movement of crabs. Karawasan is actually a collective name given to the member of the crab family found to be great in the salty and freshwater of Bislig. The lavishness of such local marine resource has, in fact, made Bislig City known to other places in the country. It was replaced by the "Tinuy-an Sayaw Festival" until it was reinstated in 2019.

Transportation

City proper land public transportation
Primary : Motorized tricycles, Electric rickshaws ("Ongbak") (roams around the vicinity of the city)
Secondary : Pedicabs/Trisikads
Inter-town travel : Jeepneys, Buses, Vans for hire ("V-hire") and Motorcycles for hire ("Habal-habal" / "Skylab")

Accessibility

Air travel
From Manila or Cebu to Davao City as transit point, Philippine Airlines, Cebu Pacific, Cebgo and PAL Express ply the Manila-Davao vice versa (approx. 1hour and 45 minutes travel time) and Cebu-Davao vice versa (approx. 55 minutes travel time) routes with several trips daily.
From Manila or Cebu to Butuan as transit point, PAL Express, Cebu Pacific and Cebgo ply these routes three times a week (Manila-Butuan – approx. 1hour and 30 minutes travel time; Cebu-Butuan – approx. 45 minutes travel time).
From Cebu to Tandag City as transit point (approx. 1 hour and 5 minutes travel time), Cebgo ply this route three times a week (destination terminated as of 2019).

Additionally, the concrete runway of Bislig's commercial airport can accommodate light commercial planes of the Fokker 50 class, though most of the time the airport is only used for the occasional private plane.

In early 2012, Jetstream of Mid-Sea Express (later Fil-Asian Airways) announced the routes Cebu-Bislig v.v. and Davao-Bislig v.v. operational at the Bislig Commercial Airport occasionally and seasonally only which lasted until 2014.

In October 2019, Leading Edge Air Services Corporation opened its Bislig-Cebu vice versa trip which lasted until January 2020. Future scheduled commercial flights will open during peak season.

Private and government charter planes and choppers still usually land at the airport.

Land travel
From Davao: Air-conditioned vans may be hired for a 4-hour and a half trip to Bislig City at reasonable rates located in the Ecoland Bus Terminal. Regular trips of Bachelor Express aircon and non-aircon buses also ply the Davao-Bislig route as early as 2:00 a.m. daily.
From Butuan: Air-conditioned vans may be hired for a 3-hour trip to Bislig City at reasonable rates located in the City Integrated Bus Terminal. Regular trips of Bachelor Express and Davao Metro Shuttle air-con and non-aircon buses also ply the Butuan route as early as 2:00 a.m. daily.
From Tandag: Air-conditioned vans may be hired for a 2-hour and a half trip to Bislig City at reasonable rates located in the City Bus Terminal.  Regular trips of Bachelor Express air-con and non-aircon buses also ply the Tandag route as early as 2:00 a.m. daily.
From Catarman, Northern Samar (Visayas): In November 2015, Philtranco bus lines launched the route Catarman to Bislig via San Francisco, Agusan del Sur.
From Cubao/Pasay (Metro Manila): As of March 2017, Philtranco bus lines launched the route Metro Manila to Bislig with Cubao and Pasay as transit points.

Sea travel
Inter-island vessels like the Cokaliong, Lite Shipping Corporation, and 2GO ply the Manila-Butuan, Cebu-Butuan and Bohol-Butuan routes on regular schedules with Nasipit Port as transit point. Air-con vans are available at the wharf and in the Nasipit terminal. Bachelor Express buses are available in the Nasipit terminal as well for a specific schedule. One may also take a jeepney ride to the Butuan integrated terminal for the regular bus trips to Bislig.

The city had developed sea ports at Barangay Lawigan and Caramcam District in Barangay Mangagoy for the increasing demand of people travelling to other provinces. Currently, operations of the Lawigan sea port is placed on hold due to project constraints.

Healthcare
HealthLink Medical Clinic and Laboratory 
Andres Soriano Memorial Hospital Cooperative 
Babano Family Medical Clinic – Hospital Inc. 
Bislig District Hospital 
Saint Vincent de Paul College Maternity & General Hospital

Education

Private schools:
De La Salle John Bosco College
STIP Pacific View College Inc.
Andres Soriano Colleges of Bislig
St. Vincent de Paul Diocesan College
Recaredo Castillo of Bislig City High School Inc.

Public schools:
Elementary
 Mangagoy District I – 6 schools
 Mangagoy District II – 8 Schools
 Bislig District I – 11 schools
 Bislig District II – 24 schools
Secondary
 Mangagoy National High School
 Bislig City National High School
 Coleto Integrated School
 Danipas National High School
 Labisma Integrated School
 Lawigan National High School
 Tabon M. Estrella National High School
 Maharlika National High School
 Mone National High School
 San Isidro National High School
 San Jose National High School
 San Vicente National High School
 Sikahoy National High School 
 Mabog National High School
 Santa Cruz National High School 
 Bucto National High School
 Tumanan National High School
Tertiary
North Eastern Mindanao State University - Bislig Campus (formerly a satellite campus of University of Southeastern Philippines)
Bislig City Surigao del Sur-District II Skills Training Center

Media
Telephone lines in Bislig are connected through PLDT, PhilCom (now acquired by PLDT) and Globe Home Phone (a subsidiary of Globe Telecom). Mobile communications are provided by Smart, Talk 'N Text, Globe, TM and Sun Cellular.

Bislig City's cable and TV satellite providers are:
Estrella & Sons Bislig City Cable TV (BCCTV)
Cignal Digital TV (GCS Mobile Link official service provider)
G Sat Direct TV

Internet providers are:
Estrella & Sons Bislig City Cable TV (BCCTV)
PhilCom/PLDT
Smart Bro and Sun Cellular
Globe

It has also ten local FM radio stations, three AM stations and one internet radio:
DXBL 801 Sonshine Radio Bislig (Sonshine Media Network International)
DXHP 999 RMN Bislig (Radio Mindanao Network)
DXBH DZRH Bislig
88.5 DXDL-FM (De La Salle John Bosco College)
91.1 Radyo Natin Bislig (Manila Broadcasting Company/Radyo Natin Network)
91.9 Brigada News FM (Brigada Mass Media Corporation)
92.7 Real Radio Bislig (PEC Broadcasting Corporation)
97.7 Enchanted FM Bislig (Hypersonic Broadcasting Center)
98.5 Like Radio Bislig (Capitol Broadcasting Center)
99.3 WOW FM (Iddes Broadcast Group)
101.7 DABIG C Radio Bislig (Prime Broadcasting Network)
103.3 Radyo Bandera Bislig (Bandera News Philippines/Fairwaves Broadcasting Network)
104.1 Win Radio Bislig (Mabuhay Broadcasting System)
Bislig i-Radio

Notable personalities

 Marcelito Pomoy – singer and Pilipinas Got Talent (season 2) Grand Winner and America's Got Talent: The Champions finalist
 Gabriel Amigo III – international Enduro mountain bike racing champion

References

External links

 Bislig Profile at the DTI Cities and Municipalities Competitive Index
 [ Philippine Standard Geographic Code]
 Philippine Census Information
 Local Governance Performance Management System
 Map Images of Bislig

 
Populated places established in 1921
1921 establishments in the Philippines
Cities in Surigao del Sur
Component cities in the Philippines